Komsomolskyi, known officially as Dubove since 2016, is an urban-type settlement in Dovzhansk Raion (district) in Luhansk Oblast of eastern Ukraine. Population:

Demographics
Native language distribution as of the Ukrainian Census of 2001:
 Ukrainian: 2.12%
 Russian: 97.59%
 Others 0.03%

References

Urban-type settlements in Dovzhansk Raion